The Serbian and Montenegrin National Badminton Championships was a national badminton tournament organized to crown the best badminton players in Serbia and Montenegro. It was conducted between 2003 and 2006; preceded by the Yugoslavian National Badminton Championships. This event eventually stopped after the separation of Serbia and Montenegro as separate nations.

Past winners

References
Details of affiliated national organisations at Badminton Europe

Badminton in Serbia and Montenegro
National badminton championships
Sports competitions in Serbia and Montenegro